Kaltan (also Romanized as Kaltān, Kaletān, and Kalatān; also known as Golestān, Kalekhtan, Kaleyān, and Qal‘eh Tān) is a village in Darram Rural District, in the Central District of Tarom County, Zanjan Province, Iran. At the 2006 census, its population was 122, in 35 families.

References 

Populated places in Tarom County